Pareas hamptoni, also known as Hampton's slug snake,  is a species of snake in the family Pareidae.

Etymology
The specific name, hamptoni, is in honor of Herbert Hampton, collector of the holotype.

Geographic range
P. hamptoni is found in Thailand, Myanmar, China, Laos, Cambodia, and Vietnam.

Original publication
Boulenger GA (1905). "Descriptions of Two New Snakes from Upper Burma". Journal of the Bombay Natural History Society 16: 235–236. (Amblycephalus hamptoni, new species, p. 236 + Figure 2, five views). (archive.org).

References

Further reading
Smith MA (1943). The Fauna of British India, Ceylon and Burma, Including the Whole of the Indo-Chinese Sub-region. Reptilia and Amphibia. Vol. III.—Serpentes. London: Secretary of State for India. (Taylor and Francis, printers). xii + 583 pp. (Pareas hamptoni, p. 120).

External links

 Flickr photo by Michael Cota, Koh Kut, Trat Provinz, Thailand
 Flickr photo by Zachary Cava, Vietnam
 Flickr photo by Zachary Cava, Vietnam

Reptiles described in 1905